Prima Rosa is Japanese pop singer Hitomi Shimatani's sixth studio album. There is both a CD and CD+DVD format. "Prima Rosa" is an Italian phrase meaning "First Rose".

CD track listing
 Ramblin'
 君の声 (Kimi no Koe, Your voice [feminine])
 晴れた日は…(Hareta Hi Wa..., Clear Day)
 Dragonfly
 サイケデリック＊フューチャー (Psychedelic Future) 
 Haru Machibito/Camellia|Camellia: カメリア (Prima Rose Version)
 Destiny -Taiyou no Hana-/Koimizu -tears of love-太陽の花- (Destiny -Taiyou no Hana-, flower of the sun)
 プラハの女 (Prague no Onna, Woman of Prague) 
 Destiny (Taiyō no Hana)/Koimizu (Tears of Love)|恋水: Tears of Love (Koimizu: Tears of Love)
 Pasio
 El Dorado
 Haru Machibito/Camellia|春待人 (Haru Machibito, The Person Waiting for Spring)
 Brand new Dream (CD-Only First Press Bonus Track)
 ふたりでいいじゃない (Futari De Iijanai, Masayuki Suzuki & Shimatani Hitomi) [Bonus Track for CD Only]

CD Extra
-Live at Tokyo Metropolitan Art Space 4.18.2006- with Diasuke Soga, Tokyo New City Orchestra

DVD track listing
 Haru Machibito
 Camellia
 Destiny: Taiyou no Hana
 Koimizu: Tears of Love
 Pasio
 Dragonfly (Prima Rosa version)
 Ramblin'
 Hare ta Hira (Off Shot Movie)
 Sara Souju [Crossover II Live - Bonus Video]
 Destiny: Taiyou no Hana [Crossover II Live - Bonus Video]
 Camellia [Crossover II Live - Bonus Video]

References 

Hitomi Shimatani albums
2007 albums